The Bagong Alyansang Makabayan or Bayan is an alliance of left-wing Philippine organizations.  It was founded on International Workers' Day, May 1, 1985 as part of the opposition during the Marcos dictatorship.

Politics

Ideology
The principle of Bayan is National Democracy. It believes that:

The Philippines is rich in natural resources but the Filipino people are deprived of it;
The history of the Philippines is the history of class struggle;
Imperialism, Feudalism and Bureaucratic Capitalism is the root of poverty; and
A National-Democratic Revolution is the solution to end the roots of poverty

However, unlike underground revolutionary organizations such as the Communist Party of the Philippines, its armed wing the New People's Army and its united front the National Democratic Front, members of Bayan do not take up arms. They participate in the urban mass movement through mass mobilizations.

Political structure
Bayan operates as an alliance of different sectoral organizations. It follows a democratic and central structure. Its own documentation suggests that it is a centralized organization, including:

 chapters as the smallest units
 the general assembly as the highest policy-making body
 the national council which meets twice a year or more often if needed
 the national executive committee to implement the policies of the general assembly and national council
 five specialized commissions
 the general secretariat that runs day-to-day operations
 a national office in Quezon City in Metro Manila.

As an umbrella group of the National-Democratic movement in the Philippines, BAYAN is associated with several organizations.

History
Bayan was founded by Leandro Alejandro and former senator Lorenzo Tañada on May 1, 1985, during the Marcos dictatorship. It brought together more than a thousand grassroots and progressive organizations, representing over a million people, largely national democratic.

It was a participant in the People Power Revolution against the Marcos dictatorship, contributing to one of the first of the non-violent, popular revolutions of the 1980s as well as involved in the creation of now-defunct Partido ng Bayan (People's Party) that participated during the 1987 elections. However, since 1998, Bayan Muna, the political party of the organization, has been the leading party-list member in the House of Representatives of the Philippines.

On August 7, 2002, the secretary-general of Bayan, Teodoro A. Casiño, claimed that under the Gloria Macapagal Arroyo presidency, soldiers murdered at least 13 Bayan and Bayan Muna members.

In a resolution past during the Bayan 7th Congress in August 2004, the coalition would expand to include overseas Filipino organizations as official members of Bayan. In January 2005, the first Bayan USA assembly was held in San Francisco. As the first overseas Bayan chapter, Bayan USA directly coordinated the implementation of Bayan campaigns to Bayan member organizations in the United States. These organizations include the NY Committee for Human Rights in the Philippines, League of Filipino Students in San Francisco State University, Anakbayan (New York/New Jersey, Los Angeles, San Diego, Honolulu, East Bay, Portland, and Seattle), the Critical Filipino/Filipina Studies Collective, Habi Ng Kalinangan, babaeSF (San Francisco), Pinay Sa Seattle, and Filipinas for Rights and Empowerment (FiRE).

After the 2007 elections, and the death of Anakpawis representative Crispin Beltran, Bayan now has five combined representatives in the 14th Congress of the Philippines, Satur Ocampo and Teodoro Casiño of Bayan Muna, Rafael V. Mariano of Anakpawis, and Liza Maza and Luzviminda Ilagan of GABRIELA.

In the 2010 elections Bayan has 7 congressmen in the lower house, including Raymond Palatino, Neri Colmenares, and Luzviminda Iligan.

During the 2013 Philippine Elections, all of the partylists except for Aking Bikolnon ran for sectoral representatives. Kalikasan and Courage were disqualified while Kabataan and Piston faced charges of disqualifications, but were subsequently lifted. Bayan Muna and GABRIELA won two seats each, seating Neri Colmenares and Carlos Zarate for Bayan Muna and Luzviminda Ilagan and Emmi de Jesus for Gabriela. Meanwhile, ACT, Anakpawis and Kabataan won 1 seat each, with Antonio Tinio, Fernando "Ka Pando" Hicap and Terry Ridon as their representatives, respectively.

Makabayan and Bayan also fielded former Bayan Muna representative Teodoro "Teddy" Casiño, who has served for 9 years as one of the congressmen of the said partylist. He placed 22nd out of 35, garnering about 3.5 million votes.

See also
National Democracy Movement (Philippines)

References

External links
Bayan website
Bayan USA website
 

Left-wing political party alliances
Left-wing politics in the Philippines
Anti-Americanism
National Democracy Movement (Philippines)
People Power Revolution
Political party alliances in the Philippines
Political parties established in 1985
Philippines
International League of Peoples' Struggle
1985 establishments in the Philippines
Socialist parties in the Philippines